There are twelve stadiums in use by Carolina League baseball teams. The oldest stadium is Bank of the James Stadium (1940) in Lynchburg, Virginia, home of the Lynchburg Hillcats. The newest stadiums are Atrium Health Ballpark and Virginia Credit Union Stadium (2021), the respective homes of the Kannapolis Cannon Ballers in Kannapolis, North Carolina, and Fredericksburg Nationals in Fredericksburg, Virginia. Two stadiums were built in the 1940s, five in the 1990s, three in the 2010s, and two in the 2020s. The highest seating capacity is 7,501 at Segra Park in Columbia, South Carolina, where the Columbia Fireflies play. The lowest capacity is 4,000 at Bank of the James Stadium and SRP Park in North Augusta, South Carolina, where the Augusta GreenJackets play.

Stadiums

Map

Gallery

See also

List of Single-A baseball stadiums
List of California League stadiums
List of Florida State League stadiums

References

General reference

External links

Carolina League
Carolina League stadiums